Sapignies is a commune in the Pas-de-Calais department in the Hauts-de-France region of France.

Geography

Population

Places of interest
 The church of St.Pierre, rebuilt, along with most of the commune, after World War I.
 The German military cemetery.

See also
Communes of the Pas-de-Calais department

References

Communes of Pas-de-Calais